Stranger Things is the third album by American jam band Edie Brickell & New Bohemians, their first studio album in sixteen years. It was released on July 25, 2006, via Fantasy Records.

Track listing 
"Stranger Things" (Edie Brickell, Kenny Withrow, New Bohemians) - 3:20
"Oh My Soul" (Brickell, Withrow) - 2:52
"Buffalo Ghost" (Brickell, New Bohemians) - 4:36
"No Dinero" (Brickell, New Bohemians) - 5:30
"Early Morning" (Brickell, Withrow, New Bohemians) - 5:00
"Lover Take Me" (Brickell, Brad Houser, New Bohemians) - 4:23
"A Funny Thing" (Brickell, Withrow, New Bohemians) - 3:05
"Mainline Cherry" (Brandon Aly, Brickell, New Bohemians) - 4:14
"Long Lost Friend" (Brickell, Withrow, New Bohemians) - 3:13
"Wear You Down" (Brickell) - 4:12
"One Last Time" (Brickell, Withrow) - 4:00
"Spanish Style Guitar" (Brickell, Withrow, New Bohemians) - 5:28
"Elephants and Ants" (Brickell, Withrow) - 6:41

Personnel 
The New Bohemians
 Edie Brickell – lead vocals, electric guitar (10)
 Carter Albrecht – keyboards, guitars, harmonica, backing vocals
 Kenny Withrow – electric guitars, acoustic guitar, slide guitar, backing vocals
 Brad Houser – bass guitar, bass clarinet, baritone saxophone
 Brandon Aly – drums
 John Bush – percussion

Additional personnel
 Bryce Goggin – backing vocals (4)
 Adam Sacks – backing vocals (4)
 Tommy Bridwell – backing vocals (5)

Production 
 Edie Brickell & the New Bohemians – producers
 Bryce Goggin – producer, recording
 Tommy Bridwell – engineer, recording (5)
 Adam Sacks – assistant engineer 
 S. Husky Hoskulds – mixing 
 Gavin Lurssen – mastering
 Abbey Anna – art direction
 Andrew Pham – art direction, package design
 Edie Brickell – illustrations
 Carla Sacks – management 

Studios
 Engineered at Tomcast Studios (Dallas, Texas).
 Recorded at Tomcast Studios and Trout Recording (Brooklyn, New York).
 Mixed at The Mute Matrix (Los Angeles, California).
 Mastered at The Mastering Lab (Ojai, California).

References 

Edie Brickell & New Bohemians albums
2006 albums